Calyptomyrmex is a genus of ants in the subfamily Myrmicinae. The genus is distributed from Africa to India and east to New Caledonia. They are mainly found in the rainforest, where they forage alone or in small numbers.

Species

Calyptomyrmex arnoldi (Forel, 1913)
Calyptomyrmex asper Shattuck, 2011
Calyptomyrmex barak Bolton, 1981
Calyptomyrmex beccarii Emery, 1887
Calyptomyrmex brevis Weber, 1943
Calyptomyrmex brunneus Arnold, 1948
Calyptomyrmex caledonicus Shattuck, 2011
Calyptomyrmex clavatus Weber, 1952
Calyptomyrmex claviseta (Santschi, 1914)
Calyptomyrmex danum Shattuck, 2011
Calyptomyrmex duhun Bolton, 1981
Calyptomyrmex foreli Emery, 1915
Calyptomyrmex fragarus Shattuck, 2011
Calyptomyrmex friederikae Kutter, 1976
Calyptomyrmex fritillus Shattuck, 2011
Calyptomyrmex grammus Shattuck, 2011
Calyptomyrmex kaurus Bolton, 1981
Calyptomyrmex lineolus Shattuck, 2011
Calyptomyrmex loweryi Shattuck, 2011
Calyptomyrmex nedjem Bolton, 1981
Calyptomyrmex nummuliticus Santschi, 1914
Calyptomyrmex ocullatus Shattuck, 2011
Calyptomyrmex piripilis Santschi, 1923
Calyptomyrmex rectopilosus Dlussky & Radchenko, 1990
Calyptomyrmex rennefer Bolton, 1981
Calyptomyrmex retrostriatus Shattuck, 2011
Calyptomyrmex ryderae Shattuck, 2011
Calyptomyrmex sabahensis Shattuck, 2011
Calyptomyrmex shasu Bolton, 1981
Calyptomyrmex singalensis Baroni Urbani, 1975
Calyptomyrmex sparsus Shattuck, 2011
Calyptomyrmex stellatus Santschi, 1915
Calyptomyrmex tamil Baroni Urbani, 1975
Calyptomyrmex taylori Shattuck, 2011
Calyptomyrmex tensus Bolton, 1981
Calyptomyrmex vedda Baroni Urbani, 1975
Calyptomyrmex wittmeri Baroni Urbani, 1975

References

External links

Myrmicinae
Ant genera